Events in the year 1901 in Belgium.

Incumbents
Monarch: Leopold II
Prime Minister: Paul de Smet de Naeyer

Events
2 August – Deposits of coal discovered at As in the province of Limburg

Publications
Series
 Biographie Nationale de Belgique, vol. 16.
 Maurice De Wulf launches 15-volume collection Les Philosophes Belges
 Ernest Gilliat-Smith, The Story of Bruges, illustrated by Edith Calvert and Herbert Railton (London, J.M. Dent)
 Joseph Van den Gheyn, Catalogue des manuscrits de la Bibliothèque royale de Belgique, vol. 1.

Studies
 Eugène Demolder, Constantin Meunier (Brussels, Edmond Deman)
 Pol de Mont, Het schildersboek: Vlaamsche schilders der negentiende eeuw, ed. Max Rooses, vol. 5.

Art and architecture

Paintings
 Théo van Rysselberghe, La Promenade

Births
21 May – Suzanne Lilar, writer (died 1992)
3 November – Leopold III of Belgium (died 1983)
25 December – Marie-Noële Kelly, traveller and hostess (died 1995)

Deaths
20 January – Zénobe Gramme (born 1826), electrical engineer
18 February – Egide Walschaerts (born 1820), inventor
30 May – Victor D'Hondt (born 1841), lawyer and mathematician
22 October – Alfred Ronner (born 1851), artist

References

 
1900s in Belgium